George Burdett may refer to:
 George Burdett (governor)
 George Burdett (politician)
 George Burdett (priest)

See also
 George Burditt (disambiguation)